The Russian Black Pied is a cattle breed that was developed from crossing the local cattle in various areas with the Dutch Black Pied and East Friesian breeds. By the beginning of 1980, the number of Black Pied cattle in Russia (excluding the Baltic population) was roughly 16.5 million. They are the second most common breed in the country.

References 

 Oklahoma State University: Russian Black Pied
 Dmitriez, N.G. and Ernst, L.K. (1989) Animal Genetic Resources of the USSR. Animal Production and Health Paper Publ. by FAO, Rome, 517 pp. (online)

Cattle breeds originating in Russia
Cattle breeds